Colonel Sir James Philip Reynolds, 1st Baronet, DSO (17 February 1865 – 12 December 1932) was an English businessman and Conservative Party politician.

Reynolds was born in Woolton, Liverpool and was educated at Ushaw College and Fort Augustus Abbey. He was a senior partner in the firm of Reynolds & Gibson, cotton brokers, of Liverpool. On 4 March 1914, he was appointed a deputy lieutenant of Lancashire. Commissioned into the 1/3rd West Lancashire Brigade, Royal Field Artillery (Territorial Force), he commanded it in the First World War and was awarded the Distinguished Service Order (DSO) in 1917.

He was elected at the 1929 general election as Member of Parliament for Liverpool Exchange, following the retirement of the Conservative MP Sir Leslie Scott. He was re-elected in 1931, and died in office in 1932, aged 67.

Reynolds was knighted in the 1920 New Year Honours and created a baronet, of Woolton in the County of Lancaster, on 6 March 1923. He was appointed High Sheriff of Lancashire for 1927.

Footnotes

References

Kidd, Charles, Williamson, David (editors). Debrett's Peerage and Baronetage (1990 edition). New York: St Martin's Press, 1990.

External links 
 

1865 births
1932 deaths
Politicians from Liverpool
Royal Artillery officers
British Army personnel of World War I
Companions of the Distinguished Service Order
Baronets in the Baronetage of the United Kingdom
Knights Bachelor
Conservative Party (UK) MPs for English constituencies
UK MPs 1929–1931
UK MPs 1931–1935
Members of the Parliament of the United Kingdom for Liverpool constituencies
High Sheriffs of Lancashire
Deputy Lieutenants of Lancashire
Businesspeople from Liverpool
People from Woolton